436th may refer to:

436th Airlift Wing, an active United States Air Force unit assigned to the Air Mobility Command Eighteenth Air Force based at Dover Air Force Base, Delaware
436th Operations Group, an active United States Air Force unit, the flying component of the Eighteenth Air Force 436th Airlift Wing
436th Tactical Fighter Training Squadron, an inactive United States Air Force unit
436th Training Squadron, an active United States Air Force unit assigned to the Air Combat Command 7th Bomb Wing, based at Dyess AFB, Texas

See also
436 (number)
436, the year 436 (CDXXXVI) of the Julian calendar
436 BC